Toned Up is an American reality television series that premiered on January 2, 2014, on Bravo. It follows the personal and professional lives of Katrina Hodgson and Karena Dawn, who have turned their makeshift beach workout videos into a business. The duo are best friends, business partners, and roommates in Manhattan Beach, California.

Episodes

References

External links 

 
 
 

2010s American reality television series
2014 American television series debuts
2014 American television series endings
English-language television shows
Television shows set in Los Angeles
Bravo (American TV network) original programming